Nastus fausti is a weevil that has been investigated as a potential biocontrol agent for giant hogweeds (Heracleum mantegazzianum Sommier et Levier, Heracleum sosnowskyi Manden, and Heracleum persicum Desf. ex Fischer.) in Europe.
During experimentation the weevils were found to not be specific against the target species and could not be recommended as a biocontrol agent.

References
https://www.cabdirect.org/cabdirect/abstract/20093043849

Entiminae